Vishal Gite (born 25 November 1992) is an Indian cricketer. He made his Twenty20 debut for Maharashtra in the 2018–19 Syed Mushtaq Ali Trophy on 21 February 2019.

References

External links
 

1992 births
Living people
Indian cricketers
Maharashtra cricketers
Place of birth missing (living people)